Karl Otto Ludwig Klaus Dierks (19 February 1936 – 17 March 2005) was a German-born Namibian deputy government minister, a transport planner and civil engineer in Namibia.

Biography
Dierks was born in 1936 in Berlin-Dahlem, Germany. He studied civil engineering and history at the Berlin Technical University and earned a diploma in Engineering in 1965 and doctorates in 1965 and 1992. Immediately after receiving his diploma, Dierks became an engineer in South Africa before moving to what is now Namibia.

In 1982 Dierks became a member of resistance movement SWAPO rising to be a member of its Central Committee. He argued for the "Development of the infrastructure regarding the road system in an independent SWA/ Namibia" in 1979 when both the topic of independence and the name "Namibia" were considered revolutionary. In the 1980s he was forced to resign after 22 years of service, and he then set up his own consultative business. It was at this time that Dierks started to write about Namibian history, "pursuing an academic war against the apartheid regime" by outlining the cultural and economic development of the area before the encroachment of European settlers and missionaries, a fact contested by the colonial regime.

At Namibian independence in 1990 he became deputy minister, first with the Works, Transport and Communication portfolio and later in the Ministry for Mines and Energy. He was a member of the National Assembly of Namibia from independence until 2000, when he retired from politics. He was known for his love of history,  mountaineering and photography.

Positions
 1990-1995 Deputy Minister in the Namibian Ministry of Public Works, Transport and Communications
 1995-2000 Deputy Minister in the Namibian Ministry of Mines and Energy
Later he served with the Namibian Electricity Control Board energy regulator and he managed to turn around TransNamib (the Namibian railway company) from loss to profit in three years.

Publications
Dierks wrote a number of scientific publications including his doctorate on the development of an improved road system in Namibia and publications on history and the settlement of ǁKhauxaǃnas in the Great Karas Mountains. He also wrote a number of publications in the field of transport and telecommunications and the book Chronology of Namibian History: From Pre-historical Times to Independent Namibia.

Family
Klaus Dierks lived up to his death with his wife Karen von Bremen and his four children in Windhoek.

References

1936 births
2005 deaths
Members of the National Assembly (Namibia)
Technical University of Berlin alumni
German emigrants to Namibia
SWAPO politicians
Government ministers of Namibia
White Namibian people
Namibian engineers
20th-century engineers